The Columbus Chill were a professional ice hockey team that played in the East Coast Hockey League from October 1991 through the 1998–99 season. They played at the Ohio Expo Center Coliseum in Columbus, Ohio. The Chill left Columbus in 1999 and relocated to Reading, Pennsylvania, with the impending arrival of the Columbus Blue Jackets in the National Hockey League. The Columbus Chill are now known as the Reading Royals.

History

The Chill
The Columbus Chill started as an expansion team in the East Coast Hockey League (now ECHL) in 1991. The Chill followed a previous minor league hockey franchise in the International Hockey League (IHL) that had transferred ownership twice and operated under three different names in Ohio's capital city: the Columbus Checkers (1966–70), Columbus Golden Seals (1971–73), and Columbus Owls (1973–77).

Chicago businessman and sports entrepreneur Horn Chen, purchased the rights to an expansion franchise in the early 1991, with the intent of placing it in Cleveland. However, new team president and general manager David Paitson convinced him that Columbus was the right market. Paitson hired former National Hockey League player Terry Ruskowski as head coach. The team started with the goal of introducing new audiences to the sport of ice hockey and building a strong fan base. The Chill quickly built an impressive and loyal fan following and garnered the attention of the media in the United States and Canada. The team's aggressive marketing campaign received unprecedented coverage for a minor-league hockey team through The Wall Street Journal (which described the Chill as "hockey for the hip"), Sports Illustrated, The Hockey News and ABC World News Sunday. Columbus Monthly said, "Going to a Chill game is like walking into the world's largest dorm party," and named it the city's "Best Sporting Event" in 1992 and 1993. The American Marketing Association would recognize the Chill as "best marketing project" in 1994 and the Canadian Broadcasting Company proclaimed- "(the) Chill is the most successful minor league franchise in history."

Although initially not successful on the ice, the Chill was a huge marketing success through their outlandish promotions. Beginning in January 1992, the Chill sold out 83 straight games - more than tripling the previous minor league hockey mark. It was a standard that would last for nearly a decade. The Chill would sell out more than 80 percent of their games during their eight-year history in the 5,600-seat Ohio State Fairgrounds Expo Coliseum, which opened in 1918 and was the oldest building to house a professional team.

While the Chill regularly filled the building, it would take Ruskowski three seasons to reach the playoffs, doing so in 1994. The Chill would go on to win division championships in 1997 and 1999 and make the playoffs five of eight seasons. Ruskowski would become the ECHL's first coach to be promoted to a higher level when he became the coach of the expansion Houston Aeros of the IHL in June 1994. All four Chill coaches (Ruskowski, Moe Mantha Jr., Brian McCutcheon and Don Granato) would advance through the ranks with two (McCutcheon, Buffalo Sabres and Granato, St. Louis Blues) becoming NHL assistant coaches. McCutcheon would be named the 1997 ECHL Coach of the Year. Paitson was named 1997 ECHL Executive of the Year.

A near disastrous scheduling snafu by Fairgrounds officials in late 1992 that, unbeknownst to the Chill, would have eliminated many of the home games in the second half of the season nearly cost the city its franchise. The problem was quickly resolved after enormous public pressure.

The united show of force helped trigger formation of a downtown arena study and talk of NHL expansion. The Chill was deeply involved in the process from the onset with Paitson appointed as the sole hockey/sports representative to the 10-person Sports Facilities Work Group that included members from the city, chamber of commerce, county and convention authority. The Chill actively promoted the city's efforts to build a downtown arena and in 1994 publicly committed to be the major tenant. In June 1996, Paitson was part of a delegation that went to New York to inform National Hockey League commissioner Gary Bettman that Columbus was interested in an NHL franchise. In February 1997, the Franklin County Commissioners approved putting a 0.5 percent, three-year sales tax on the May ballot to help finance the construction of a $277 million complex that included a 21,000-seat arena and a 30,000-seat soccer stadium for the Columbus Crew of Major League Soccer. Issue One was defeated at the ballot on May 6, 1997, just days before the NHL was to announce its decision on expansion. Three days later, the NHL granted Columbus and other expansion city hopefuls more time to resolve their arena problems.

On June 2, 1997, the arena portion of the project was rescued as Nationwide Realty, Inc. announced it would build the arena privately. John H. McConnell, founder of Worthington Industries, stepped forward to become the principal owner of the NHL expansion franchise, later to be named the Columbus Blue Jackets. The NHL board of governors on June 25, 1997, approved Columbus, Atlanta,  Minneapolis-St. Paul, and Nashville as expansion cities.

With the impending arrival of the Blue Jackets' first game in October 2000, the 1998–99 ECHL season would be the Chill's final one as the team was voluntarily suspended. As part of an agreement with McConnell, Chen would receive a small ownership stake in the Blue Jackets.

Suspension and relocation
After the 1998–99 season, the Chill suspended operations for both the 1999–2000 and the 2000–01 ECHL seasons after the arrival of the Columbus Blue Jackets. The Columbus Chill were sold and relocated to Reading, Pennsylvania, during their two-year inactive status to become the Reading Royals for the 2001–02 ECHL season.

Success and community impact
The Chill would send five players to the NHL and promote others to the American Hockey League and International Hockey League. Numerous Chill front office employees advanced their careers to NHL, NFL, NBA, MLB, NCAA, NASCAR, Indy Racing League, etc., including several front office employees of the Blue Jackets.

In addition to the Chill being the catalyst for the NHL coming to Columbus, the franchise provided much-needed services to the skating community. The Chill has the distinction of becoming the first minor league team to build, own, and operate its own facility (Chiller Dublin, 1993) and opened their second dual ice rink (Chiller Easton, 1997). They joined the Mighty Ducks of Anaheim as one of only two franchises at any level to own and operate two facilities.

Considered to be among the finest ice rink facilities in the United States, the Chillers provided the platform for an explosion of hockey from learn-to-skate classes to adult leagues: Nine high-school hockey programs and youth hockey participation grew from 150 to over 1,300 kids during the 1990s while the Chill was in existence. The Columbus Chill Youth Hockey Association (CCHYA)continues to thrive.

A partnership formed in 1997 between the Chill and Blue Jackets had resulted in the Chillers and the NHL club owning and managing eight sheets of ice in Central Ohio - Chiller North was added in 2003 and the Chiller Ice Works in 2005 - as well as serving as an integral marketing extension of the Blue Jackets' brand.

Highlights
 1991 – Chicago businessman Horn Chen purchases an expansion franchise.
 1992 – Chill begins minor league hockey record 83 game sellout streak (191 sellouts in franchise history); set ECHL regular-season (1991–92) records at the time for highest goals against average (5.33, 341 goals in 64 games, still 5th in ECHL history), most power-play goals against (111, 2nd in ECHL history), most penalty minutes (2,751, 4th in ECHL history), and highest penalty minutes per-game average (43.0, 2,751 minutes in 64 games, 3rd in ECHL history); named "Best Sporting Event in Columbus" by Columbus Monthly; named as the "Best New Addition to Columbus" and for the "Athlete you'd most want to drink a beer with" - Columbus Alive; Inspires a board game - "A Night at the Chill," created by team's first season ticket holder Steve Miller.
 1993 – "Marketing Project-of-the-Year for Creativity and Impact" - Central Ohio, Chapter, American Marketing Association; Named "Best Sporting Event in Columbus" and "Best Promotion" by Columbus Monthly.
 1994 – Team makes playoffs for first time; Ruskowski becomes the first ECHL coach to get hired as a head coach at the next level (IHL's Houston Aeros). Moe Mantha Jr. replaces Ruskowski as head coach.
 1996 – Mantha becomes head coach of the Baltimore Bandits (later Cincinnati Mighty Ducks) of the American Hockey League. Brian McCutcheon replaces Mantha as head coach.
 1997 – First place in North Division and third overall in ECHL (1996–97), record for most 20-or-more goal scorers in one season (9 in 70 games played: Dave Hymovitz, 39; Derek Gauthier, 33; Joe Coombs, 28; Derek Wood, 27; Keith Morris, 26; Derek Clancey, 26; Lorne Toews, 25; Matt Oates, 22; Mark Turner, 20). Brian McCutcheon named East Coast Hockey League's Coach of the Year. David Paitson awarded ECHL Executive of the Year. 1997 - McCutcheon becomes head coach of the AHL's Rochester Americans. Don Granato replaces McCutcheon as head coach.
 1999 – First place in Northwest Division, second in Northern Conference, seventh overall in ECHL (1998–99). "Last Call" on April 4 draws 191st and final sellout. All-Time Chill Team named: Goaltender - Jeff Salajko; Defensemen - Lance Brady and Barry Dreger; Forwards - Derek Clancey, Jason "Smurf" Christie and Rob Schriner; Enforcer - Phil Crowe.

Season-by-season record
Note: GP = Games played, W = Wins, L = Losses, T = Ties, OTL = Overtime losses, Pts = Points, GF = Goals for, GA = Goals against, PIM = Penalties in minutesRecords as per HockeyDB:

Head coaches
 Terry Ruskowski (1991–94)
 Moe Mantha, Jr. (1994–96)
 Brian McCutcheon (1996–97)
 Don Granato (1997–99)

General managers
 David Paitson (1991–98)
 Don Granato (1998–99)

Players
 Beau Bilek - games played (266)
 Keith Morris - goals (104)
 Derek Clancey - assists (218), points (313)
 Barry Dreger - PIM (663)
 Matt Oates - tied for most power-play goals in a game (4 goals in 1996 at Erie)
 Jason "the Smurf" Christie
 Phil Crowe *NHL
 Trent Kaese *NHL - 3rd most consecutive three-or-more goal games (1992 vs. Toledo, Dayton and Knoxville)
 Rob Schriner
 Barry Dreger
 Rob Sangster
 Corey Bricknell
 Blair Atcheynum *NHL
 Jeff Salajko - tied for most saves by a goaltender, period (30 in 1997 vs. Roanoke)
 Eric Manlow *NHL
 Sasha Lakovic *NHL
 Marc Magliarditi
 Cam Brown *NHL
 Jason Smart - captained first Chill playoff team in 1994
 Lance Brady - Captain 1994-1995

See also
 List of ECHL seasons

References

External links
 Columbus Blue Jackets
 The Internet Hockey Database
 ECHL
 ECHL Hall of Fame

1991 establishments in Ohio
1999 disestablishments in Ohio
Defunct ECHL teams
Defunct ice hockey teams in Ohio
Ice hockey clubs established in 1991
Ice hockey clubs disestablished in 1999
Sports teams in Columbus, Ohio
Anaheim Ducks minor league affiliates
Vancouver Canucks minor league affiliates